The Yuxingshan Reservoir is a medium-sized reservoir located in Cangshuipu Town of Heshan District, Yiyang, in northern Hunan in the southern China.

History
The Yuxingshan Reservoir was constructed in the late 1960s by the local government for irrigation purposes.

Public access
The Yuxingshan Reservoir is open to public on all day.

The reservoir provides an attractive setting for many outdoor activities, including fishing, hiking, pleasure boating, and water skiing.

References

External links

Reservoirs in Yiyang
Tourist attractions in Yiyang
Heshan District, Yiyang